Across the Divide is a 1921 American silent Western film directed by John Holloway and starring Rex Ballard, Rosemary Theby and Ralph McCullough.

Plot 
Left by his dying mother in the care of Buck (Rex Ballard), Wallace Layson (Ralph McCullough) has no knowledge of his real identity. Wallace is to inherit a ranch on his 21st birthday.  His father returns and induces Rosa (Rosemary Theby), a dancehall girl, to marry Wallace in a plot to cheat him out of his inheritance.  But Wallace is in love with Helen (Dorothy Manners).  Buck tells Wallace that the real heir has died and persuades him to pose as the heir, which foils the plans of his father and secures a home for Wallace and Helen.  Buck reveals the Wallace's true identity and leaves without revealing that he is the Wallace's half brother.

Cast
 Rex Ballard as Buck Layson
 Rosemary Theby as Rosa
 Ralph McCullough as Wallace Layson 
 Thomas Delmar as Dago
 Gilbert Clayton as Newton
 Dorothy Manners as Helen
 Flora Hollister as White Flower

Themes 
According to A Guide to Silent Westerns, the film is an "early drama" that "takes advantage of the natural surroundings, thus anticipating one of the prerequisites of a good Western."

References

External links
 

1921 films
1921 Western (genre) films
American black-and-white films
Associated Exhibitors films
1920s English-language films
Silent American Western (genre) films
1920s American films